Thomas Jervis may refer to:
 Thomas Jervis (judge)
 Thomas Jervis (minister)
 Tom Jervis, Australian basketball player